Robert Mitchell may refer to:

Arts and entertainment
 Robert Mitchell (engraver) (1820–1873), English engraver
 Robert Boyed Mitchell (1919–2002), Australian painter
 Robert Mitchell (jazz pianist) (born 1971), British jazz pianist and composer
 Robert Mitchell (organist) (1912–2009), American organist and silent film accompanist

Politics

Australia
 Rob Mitchell (Queensland politician) (born 1948), member of the Queensland Legislative Assembly
 Rob Mitchell (Victorian politician) (born 1967), member of the Australian House of Representatives

Canada
 Robert Mitchell (Prince Edward Island politician), local Canadian politician
 Robert C. Mitchell (1931–2007), politician in Ontario, Canada
 Bob Mitchell (Saskatchewan politician) (1936–2016), lawyer, civil servant and politician in Saskatchewan, Canada
 Robert Weld Mitchell (1915–1994), lawyer, member of the Canadian House of Commons for Ontario

New Zealand
 Robert Mitchell (New Zealand politician), elected 1868, from Otago, New Zealand

United Kingdom
 Robert James Mitchell (1912–1998), MP in the Northern Ireland Parliament for North Armagh
 Robert MacGregor Mitchell, Lord MacGregor Mitchell (1875–1938), British Member of Parliament

United States
 Robert Mitchell (congressman) (1778–1848), member of the US House of Representatives from Ohio
 Robert Mitchell (Wisconsin politician) (1826–1899), Wisconsin legislator
 Robert Byington Mitchell (1823–1882), governor of New Mexico territory and Civil War general

Sports
 Robert Mitchell (baseball) (1900–1971), American Negro league baseball player
 Robert Mitchell (canoeist) (born 1949), American canoer
 Robert Mitchell (cricketer) (1863–1926), Australian cricketer
 Robert Mitchell (high jumper) (born 1980), British high jumper
 Rob Mitchell (rower) (born 1976), Australian lightweight rower
 Robert Mitchell (speed skater) (1972–2022), British Olympic speed skater
 Robert Mitchell (water polo) (1913–1996), British water polo player and later Conservative member of the Greater London Council
 Robert Mitchell (weightlifter) (1911–1992), American Olympic weightlifter

Other
 Robert A. Mitchell (1926–2006), American Jesuit
 Robert Mitchell (priest) (1870–1949), Dean of Lincoln, 1930–1949
 Robert Mitchell (Presbyterian minister) (1851–1929), became the first Presbyterian to be ordained in South Australia
 Robert Menzies Mitchell (1865–1932), physician and political figure in Saskatchewan, Canada
 Robert W. Mitchell (1933–2010), American invertebrate zoologist and photographer
 Robert Edward Mitchell, American historian
 Robert Lyell Mitchell (1910–1982), Scottish chemist and mountaineer
 Robert Mitchell (architect), Scottish architect

See also
 Bobby Mitchell (disambiguation)
 Bob Mitchell (disambiguation)
 Bert Mitchell (disambiguation)
 Robert Michell (disambiguation)